Sally Archibald is a South African scientist and Associate Professor at the University of Witwatersrand. Her research primarily focuses on savanna ecosystems within the context of global climate change as well as the exploration of fire ecology and earth-system feedbacks. Archibald was the recipient of the 2012 Mercer Award for her co-authorship of the paper "Tree cover in sub-Saharan Africa: Rainfall and fire constrain forest and savanna as alternative stable states".

Early life and education 
Sally Archibald attended the University of Cape Town in Cape Town, Western Cape from 2000 to 2002 where she received her MSc in botany. In 2010, Archibald received her PhD in ecology from the University of Witwatersrand in Johannesburg, Gauteng.

Career and research 
Archibald began her career at the University of Cape Town as a researcher in the Department of Biological Sciences from 1999 to 2000. Her primary research centered on assessing the ecological status and reserve selection of urban freshwater systems. From 2007 to 2009, Archibald served as the Visiting Student Research Collaborator in the Department of Ecology and Evolutionary Biology at Princeton University in Princeton, New Jersey. Archibald was the Principal Researcher at the Council for Scientific and Industrial Research (CSIR), located in Pretoria, Guateng in the Natural Resources and Environmental Research area from 2005 to 2014.

Archibald is currently an Associate Professor of Animal, Plant and Environmental Sciences at the University of Witwatersrand where she has taught since 2012. She teaches undergraduate courses in Fundamentals of Ecology, Whole Plant Physiology, and Functional Ecology in Changing Environments.

Archibald's work incorporates ecological data gathered from the field, remote sensing, biogeochemistry and modeling. Archibald is involved in research projects at Yale University, the University of Edinburgh and the University of Liverpool, and is also working on research projects with the Global Change and Ecosystems group at the CSIR where she studies topics ranging from the relationship between fire and animal grazers, land-atmosphere feedbacks and savannas around the world.

Awards and honors 
Sally Archibald and one of her co-authors, Carla Staver, were the 2012 recipients of the George Mercer Award for their paper "Tree cover in sub-Saharan Africa: Rainfall and fire constrain forest and savanna as alternative stable states" which was published in Ecology in 2011. The George Mercer Award is presented to a researcher under the age of 40 who has authored an outstanding ecological research paper within the past two years. The committee selected Archibald and Staver due to their application of ecological theory to the exploration of the feedbacks that impact global vegetation patterns. The research added many contributions to the field of ecology including that transitions from forest to savannah along tropical latitudes result from changing fire patterns and will occur in the near future.

Selected publications 
Sally Archibald has published over 120 works which have been cited over 8,000 times. Her research focuses on savanna ecology, global climate change, fire ecology, vegetation dynamics and earth-system feedbacks. Some of Archibald's most cited works are listed here.

References 

21st-century South African botanists
South African women botanists
Women ecologists
Academic staff of the University of the Witwatersrand
University of Cape Town alumni
University of the Witwatersrand alumni
Year of birth missing (living people)
Living people
21st-century South African women scientists